In addition to contributing scores to over 100 feature films and themes to television series, Danny Elfman has made a number of appearances in film and on television, typically as himself, in a singing role or as the lead singer of Oingo Boingo. For a full list of Elfman's compositions and discographies, see the List of compositions by Danny Elfman page, his film and concert music discography page and the Oingo Boingo discography page.

References

Elfman, Danny
Danny Elfman
Lists of films and television series